The Taito F3 Package System (Taito Cybercore in North America) is a 32-bit arcade system board released by Taito in 1992.

Specifications
 CPU: Motorola MC68EC020;
 Sound CPU: Motorola MC68000;
 Sound chip: Ensoniq ES5505 and ES5510 (DSP);
 Video resolution: 320×224;
 Board composition: Board and F3 cartridge;
 Hardware features: four scrolling layers, two sprite banks, Alpha blending

Games
 Arabian Magic
 Arkanoid Returns
 Bubble Memories
 Bubble Symphony / Bubble Bobble 2
 Cleopatra Fortune
 Command War - Super Special Battle & War Game
 Darius Gaiden - Silver Hawk
 Dungeon Magic
 Elevator Action Returns
 Gekirindan
 Grid Seeker
 International Cup '94
 Kaiser Knuckle / Global Champion / Dan-Ku-Ga
 Kirameki Star Road
 LandMaker
 Puzzle Bobble 2 / Bust-A-Move Again
 Puzzle Bobble 2x
 Puzzle Bobble 3
 Puzzle Bobble 4
 Pop 'N Pop
 Puchi Carat
 Quiz Theater
 Moriguchi Hiroko no Quiz de Hyuu! Hyuu!
 RayForce
 Recalhorn
 Riding Fight
 Ring Rage
 Super Cup Finals
 Space Invaders '95 - The Attack of Lunar Loonies
 Top Ranking Stars
 Twin Cobra II

References

External links
 System16 - The Arcade Museum
 Taito F3 System arcade hardware games list and statistics

Taito arcade system boards
68k-based arcade system boards